As of July 2016, the IUCN lists 32,383 animal species and 6,635 plant species as least concern. No least concern assessments have been made for taxa of other kingdoms.

Lists:

Animals (kingdom Animalia) 
Amphibians — List of least concern amphibians
Birds — List of least concern birds
Fish — List of least concern fishes
Invertebrates — List of least concern invertebrates
Arthropods — List of least concern arthropods
Insects — List of least concern insects
Molluscs List of least concern molluscs
Mammals — List of least concern mammals
Reptiles — List of least concern reptiles
Plants (kingdom Plantae) — List of least concern plants

See also
List of Chromista by conservation status — 0 listed as least concern
List of fungi by conservation status — 0 listed as least concern
:Category:IUCN Red List least concern species

References